José Refugio Esparza Reyes (August 23, 1921 – November 12, 2015) was a Mexican teacher, politician and member of the Institutional Revolutionary Party (PRI). He served as the Governor of the Mexican state of Aguascalientes from 1974 until 1980.

Esparza Reyes was born on August 23, 1921, in the former village of Mexiquito, located in the community of Viudas de Oriente, Villa Juárez, Aguascalientes. The village of Mexiquito, his birthplace, no longer exists.

He created a number of state social programs, notably Operation Bee (Operación Abeja), which promoted citizen participation and transparency in rural areas.

José Refugio Esparza Reyes was hospitalized on November 11, 2015. He died at a private hospital in Aguascalientes City on November 12, 2015, at the age of 94. The Aguascalientes state government and Governor Carlos Lozano de la Torre declared two days of mourning from November 12–13, 2015. His funeral, accompanied by honor guards, was held at the state Government Palace.

References

1921 births
2015 deaths
Governors of Aguascalientes
Mexican educators
Institutional Revolutionary Party politicians
Politicians from Aguascalientes
Members of the Congress of Aguascalientes
20th-century Mexican politicians